Alben is both a surname and a given name. Notable people with the name include:

 Alben W. Barkley (1877–1956), American lawyer and politician, 35th vice president of the United States
 Alex Alben (born 1958), American politician and writer
 Işıl Alben (born 1986), Turkish basketball player
 Russ Alben (1929–2012), American advertising executive and composer
 Silas D. Alben, 21st century American mathematician